Harris v. Viegelahn, 575 U.S. 498 (2015), was a United States Supreme Court case in which the Court clarified procedures for disposing wages after a debtor files for bankruptcy. In a unanimous opinion written by Justice Ruth Bader Ginsburg, the Court held that if a debtor earns money after filing Chapter 13 bankruptcy proceedings, and converts to Chapter 7 bankruptcy before the money is sent to creditors, the debtor is permitted to keep those funds.

Opinion of the Court 
Associate Justice Ruth Bader Ginsburg authored the unanimous opinion of the Court, which reversed the opinion of the United States Court of Appeals for the Fifth Circuit and remanded the case to that court for further proceedings.

References

External links
 
 SCOTUSblog coverage

United States Supreme Court cases
United States Supreme Court cases of the Roberts Court
2015 in United States case law